The Asian American movement was a sociopolitical movement in which the widespread grassroots effort of Asian Americans affected racial, social and political change in the U.S., reaching its peak in the late 1960s to mid-1970s. During this period Asian Americans promoted anti-war and anti-imperialist activism, directly opposing what was viewed as an unjust Vietnam war. The American Asian Movement (AAM) differs from previous Asian American activism due to its emphasis on Pan-Asianism and its solidarity with U.S. and international Third World movements such as the Third World Liberation Front.

Daryl Joji Maeda states that, "Its founding principle of coalition politics emphasizes solidarity among Asians of all ethnicities, multiracial solidarity among Asian Americans as well as with African, Latino, and Native Americans in the United States, and transnational solidarity with peoples around the globe impacted by U.S. militarism". 

The movement was initially student-based, emerging simultaneously on various college campuses and urban communities.  The AAM was largely concentrated in the San Francisco Bay Area, Los Angeles, and New York City but extended as far as Honolulu. The movement created community service programs, art, poetry, music, and other creative works; offered a new sense of self-determination; and raised the political and racial consciousness of Asian Americans.

Background 
Before the 1960s, Asian immigrants to the United States were often perceived as a threat to Western civilization in what became known as "Yellow Peril". This in turn led to the mistreatment and abuse of Asians in America across generations, through historical incidents like the Chinese Exclusion Act, the Japanese internment camps, and the Vietnam War. However, after the Hart–Celler Act of 1965, the increase of immigrants from highly educated backgrounds mainly coming from East Asia led to the perception that Asian Americans were a "model minority." Yet despite these positive assessments, many Asian Americans were still treated as "perpetual foreigners".

Asian American groups started to emerge as second and third-generation Asian American activists moved up in the leadership hierarchy of their interest groups. Many of these new leaders associated with each other while growing up in schools and social groups and chose to focus on their collective identities as Asian Americans rather than their national heritage.

Though activism against discrimination was a part of Asian American culture before the 1960s, it was limited in scope and lacked a wide base of support. Various groups focused on class-based politics aimed to gain better wages and working conditions, homeland politics attempted to bolster the international standings of their nations of origins or free them from colonial rule, and assimilationist politics attempted to demonstrate that Asians were worthy of the rights and privileges of citizenship. These instances of social and political activism did not directly address issues facing all Asian Americans at the time. Asian immigrants were largely divided in America; before the 1960s, there was very little solidarity between the various Asian immigrant communities. These disparate groups dealt largely with issues concerning their own ethnic communities and conclaves, focusing the majority of their efforts on survival in their exclusionary environment. As a result of these factors, pre-1960s activism never rose to the level of a movement.

Early developments 
In the early to mid-1960's, a number of individual Asian Americans activists such as Yuri Kochiyama participated individually in the Free Speech Movement, Civil Rights Movement, and anti-Vietnam War movement. Yuji Ichioka and Emma Gee founded the Asian American Political Alliance (AAPA) in May 1968 at UC Berkeley. Ichioka coined the term "Asian American" for it during its founding. Because Asian Americans had been called Orientals before 1968, the formation of the AAPA challenged the use of the pejorative term. According to Karen Ishizuka, the label "Asian American" was "an oppositional political identity imbued with self-definition and empowerment, signaling a new way of thinking.” Unlike prior activism the AAM and by extension organizations like the AAPA embraced a pan-Asian focus within their organization accepting members from Chinese, Japanese, and Filipino communities regardless of whether they were born in America or immigrants. The promotion of a pan-Asian ideology brought together the formerly separated groups within Asian American communities to combat common racial oppression experienced in the nation.

The Asian American movement drew upon influences from the Black Power and antiwar movements, declaring solidarity with other races of people in the United States and abroad. Some promoted the slogan of "Yellow Power," although they were less prone than organizations such as the Black Panthers to encourage conflict with law enforcement.

Activists like Richard Aoki for example, served as a Field Marshal of the Black Panther Party prior to helping to form AAPA. Another organization, Asian Americans for Action (AAA), founded in 1969 on the East Coast by two longtime-leftist Nisei women, Kazu Iijima and Minn Matsuda, was highly influenced by Black Power Movement and the anti war movement, even much more than the AAPA. Yuri Kochiyama was also one of the organization's members.

Global decolonization and Black Power helped create the political conditions needed to link pan-Asianism to Third World internationalism. Segments of the movement struggled for community control of education, provided social services and defended affordable housing in Asian ghettos, organized exploited workers, protested against U.S. imperialism, and built new multiethnic cultural institutions.

Key Asian American figures

Key organizations

References

Asian-American society
Asian-American movement activists
Political movements in the United States